German submarine U-957 was a Type VIIC U-boat of Nazi Germany's Kriegsmarine during World War II.

Laid down by Blohm & Voss, Hamburg on 11 March 1942, the U-boat was launched on 21 November 1942, and commissioned on 7 January 1943, by Oberleutnant zur See Franz Saar.

Design
German Type VIIC submarines were preceded by the shorter Type VIIB submarines. U-957 had a displacement of  when at the surface and  while submerged. She had two shafts and two  propellers.

U-957 was fitted with five  torpedo tubes (four fitted at the bow and one at the stern), fourteen torpedoes, one  SK C/35 naval gun, 220 rounds, and one twin  C/30 anti-aircraft gun. The boat had a complement of between forty-four and sixty.

Service history
Under the command of Oberleutnant zur See Gerhard Schaar U-957 carried out seven war patrols between December 1943 and October 1944, sinking two commercial vessels; the British Fort Bellingham and the Soviet survey vessel Nord; and two military vessels, the American submarine chaser , and the Soviet corvette Brilliant.

Fate
Her combat career ended on 19 October 1944 at Lofoten, Norway, when she collided with a German steamer. On 21 October 1944 she was taken out of service in Trondheim.

In May 1945, she was probably scuttled in the Skjömenfjord.

Summary of raiding history

References

Notes

Citations

Bibliography

External links

German Type VIIC submarines
World War II submarines of Germany
U-boats commissioned in 1943
1942 ships
Ships built in Hamburg
U-boat accidents
Maritime incidents in October 1944